The Pasadena Police Department (PPD) is the primary law enforcement agency servicing a population of 144,793 people within  of the municipality of Pasadena, Texas.

Organization
The PPD is currently under the command of Chief of Police Josh Bruegger. The PPD is divided into four bureaus:
 
Administration Bureau 
Support Services Bureau
Investigations Bureau
Uniformed Services/Operations Bureau

Fallen officers
Since the establishment of the Pasadena Police Department, four officers have died in the line of duty.

See also

 List of law enforcement agencies in Texas

References

External links

Pasadena, Texas
Municipal police departments of Texas